DXTS (94.3 FM), broadcasting as 94.3 DZRH News FM, is a radio station owned and operated by Manila Broadcasting Company through its licensee, Cebu Broadcasting Company. The station's studio and transmitter are located at the 3rd floor, RD Plaza Bldg., Pendatun Ave., Brgy. Dadiangas West, General Santos. It operates 24 hours a day.

Despite carrying the DZRH brand, it usually airs its own programming. It is the second FM station of MBC to carry a hybrid of music & news after Ben FM in Northern Cebu.

History
It was formerly known as Hot FM carrying a mass-based format from 1999 to May 2009. In July 2009, it changed its brand to Easy Rock and switched to a Soft AC format, competing with Home Radio. In February 2014, the station, along with MBC's O&O Hot FM stations, rebranded as Yes FM, reverting to its masa-based format. In September 2019, it was reformatted into a music and news/talk format, this time using the DZRH branding.

References

Radio stations in General Santos
Radio stations established in 1999